Baldoo (or Baldu) is a village located in Ladnu Tehsil, Nagaur District, in Rajasthan, India. It has a population of 6540, composing approximately 1400 families.

References

Villages in Nagaur district